Crocoideae is one of the major subfamilies in the family Iridaceae.

It contains plants which are widely distributed in the Old World, mainly in Africa, but there are species like some members of the genera Romulea and Gladiolus which are native to Europe and Asia. Some examples are Romulea bulbocodium, Romulea columnae and Gladiolus italicus.

Like the rest of Iridaceae, the members of the subfamily have the typical sword-shaped leaves. The rootstock is usually a corm. The blooms which sometimes have scent are collected in inflorescence and contain six tepals. The nectar is produced mostly in the base of the bloom from the glands of the ovary, which is where the flower forms a tube-like end. In some species there is no such end and the plant only provides pollen to pollinating insects.

The ovary is 3-locular and many-seeded, the appearance of the testa varying widely between the different genera: sometimes fine and delicate, as in the case of  Gladiolus and at others black and hard, as in the case of Babiana. The shape of the seed is often pellet-like and may also be globular, discoid or semi-discoid.

Many genera of this group furnish species numbered among the most familiar ornamental plants to be grown in the open garden or in containers, some good examples being Freesia, Ixia, Crocosmia and Gladiolus.

Taxonomy

Tribe Tritoniopsideae
 Tritoniopsis
Tribe Watsonieae
 Cyanixia
 Lapeirousia
 Micranthus
 Pillansia
 Savannosiphon
 Thereianthus
 Watsonia
 Zygotritonia
Tribe Gladioleae
 Gladiolus
 Melasphaerula
Tribe Freesieae
 Crocosmia
 Devia
 Freesia
 Xenoscapa
Tribe Ixieae
 Afrocrocus
 Babiana
 Chasmanthe
 Crocus
 Dierama
 Duthiastrum
 Geissorhiza
 Hesperantha
 Ixia
 Radinosiphon
 Romulea
 Sparaxis
 Syringodea
 Tritonia

References

Iridaceae
Asparagales subfamilies